Santarém Novo (English: New Santarem) is a municipality in the state of Pará in the Northern region of Brazil.

The municipality contains the  Chocoaré - Mato Grosso Extractive Reserve, created in 2002, which protects part of the right (east) shore of the Maracanã River.

See also
List of municipalities in Pará

References

Municipalities in Pará